A Moon Shaped Pool is the ninth studio album by the English rock band Radiohead. It was released digitally on 8 May 2016, and physically on 17 June 2016 through XL Recordings. It was produced by Radiohead's longtime producer Nigel Godrich.

Radiohead recorded A Moon Shaped Pool in RAK Studios in London, their studio in Oxford, and the La Fabrique studio in Saint-Rémy-de-Provence, France. It features prominent use of strings and choral vocals arranged by the guitarist Jonny Greenwood and performed by the London Contemporary Orchestra. Several songs, such as "True Love Waits" and "Burn the Witch", were written years earlier. The lyrics address climate change, groupthink and heartbreak; many critics saw them as a response to singer Thom Yorke's split from his partner Rachel Owen. Radiohead's longtime collaborator Stanley Donwood created the abstract cover by exposing his paintings to weather.

Radiohead promoted A Moon Shaped Pool with singles and videos for "Burn the Witch" and "Daydreaming", a viral campaign of postcards and social media posts, and a series of video vignettes. Radiohead toured in 2016, 2017 and 2018, with headline performances at festivals including Glastonbury and Coachella. The tour included a performance in Tel Aviv, which drew criticism from supporters of Boycott, Divestment and Sanctions, a campaign for an international cultural boycott of Israel.

A Moon Shaped Pool was named one of the best albums of the year and decade by many publications. It was the fifth Radiohead album nominated for the Mercury Prize, and was nominated for Best Alternative Music Album and Best Rock Song (for "Burn the Witch") at the 59th Annual Grammy Awards. It topped the charts in several countries, becoming Radiohead's sixth number one on the UK Album Charts, and was a bestseller on vinyl. It is certified gold in the UK, US, Canada, Australia, France and Italy.

Background
Several songs on A Moon Shaped Pool were written years before the recording. Radiohead first performed "True Love Waits" in 1995, and attempted to record it several times, but could not settle on an arrangement; over the years, it became one of their best-known unreleased songs. Radiohead first worked on "Burn the Witch" in the sessions for Kid A (2000) and again in subsequent album sessions. The songwriter, Thom Yorke, first performed "Present Tense" in a solo set at the UK Latitude Festival in 2009.

During the tour for their eighth album, The King of Limbs (2011), Radiohead performed new material, including the future Moon Shaped Pool tracks "Identikit" and "Ful Stop". On tour in 2012, they recorded two songs at the Third Man Records studio in Nashville, Tennessee, including a version of "Identikit", but discarded the recordings as substandard. After the tour ended that year, Radiohead entered hiatus and the members worked on side projects.

Recording

Radiohead began work on A Moon Shaped Pool with their longtime producer Nigel Godrich in their Oxford studio in September 2014. They were slow to regain momentum after their break and worked in "fits and starts". The Oxford sessions lasted until Christmas. In 2015, Radiohead spent three weeks in the La Fabrique studio near Saint-Rémy-de-Provence, France, building on their Oxford recordings. The studio, originally a nineteenth-century mill producing art pigment, had been used by musicians including Morrissey and Nick Cave and houses the world's largest vinyl record collection.

Yorke had few demos and there was no rehearsal period. According to the guitarist Ed O'Brien, "We just went straight into recording ... The sound emerged as we recorded." Instead of using computers, Godrich recorded the band to tape with analog multitrack recorders, inspired by Motown and early David Bowie records. This added creative limits, as rerecording a take meant erasing the previous take. According to the bassist, Colin Greenwood, "It forces you to have to make decisions in the moment; it's very much the opposite of having your album stored on a terabyte hard drive."

For the introduction to "Daydreaming", Radiohead slowed the tape, creating a pitch-warping effect. The guitarist Jonny Greenwood used the music programming language Max to manipulate the piano on "Glass Eyes". "Identikit" developed from loops of Yorke's vocals recorded during the King of Limbs sessions. The drummer Clive Deamer, who had performed with Radiohead on the King of Limbs tour and appeared on their 2011 double single "The Daily Mail" and "Staircase", played additional drums on "Ful Stop".

The strings and choir sections were arranged by Jonny Greenwood and performed by the London Contemporary Orchestra, with Hugh Brunt as conductor. The orchestra had previously worked with Greenwood on his score for the 2012 film The Master. The strings were recorded at RAK Studios in London. For "Burn the Witch", the players used guitar plectrums rather than bows, creating a percussive effect. "Daydreaming" was finished early in the La Fabrique sessions; Yorke described it as a "breakthrough" for the album. Greenwood had the cellists detune their cellos, creating a "growling" sound. Additional string and choir parts were recorded but cut.

Godrich's father Vic died on the day of the recording of the strings for "Burn the Witch". According to Godrich, "I literally left him on a fucking table in my house and went and recorded. And it was a very, very emotional day for me. He was a string player as well so it was one of those things where it felt like he would want me to go and just do this." Around the same period, Yorke announced his separation from his wife, Rachel Owen, who died of cancer several months after the album's completion. The special edition of the album is dedicated to Vic Godrich and drum technician Scott Johnson, who died in the 2012 stage collapse before Radiohead's scheduled show in Downsview Park, Toronto. Yorke told Rolling Stone: "There was a lot of difficult stuff going on at the time, and it was a tough time for us as people. It was a miracle that that record got made at all."

Work was interrupted by the recording of "Spectre", commissioned for the 2015 James Bond film. The film producers rejected the song as "too dark". Godrich said: "That fucking James Bond movie threw us a massive curveball. It was a real waste of energy ... In terms of making A Moon Shaped Pool it caused a stop right when we were in the middle of it." In December 2015, at the United Nations Climate Change Conference in Paris, Yorke performed three Moon Shaped Pool songs: "The Numbers" (then known as "Silent Spring"), "Present Tense" and "Desert Island Disk". On Christmas Day, Radiohead released "Spectre" on the audio streaming site SoundCloud. Jonny Greenwood estimated that 80% of the album was recorded in two weeks. After Radiohead finished work in France, Godrich edited and mixed the album in London.

Music
A Moon Shaped Pool incorporates art rock, folk, chamber music, ambient music and baroque pop. It combines electronic elements such as drum machines and synthesisers, acoustic timbres such as guitar and piano, and string and choral arrangements, which feature more heavily than on previous Radiohead albums. The Guardian characterised A Moon Shaped Pool as more restrained and "pared back" than Radiohead's earlier work.

The songs are sequenced in alphabetical order, which Jonny Greenwood said was chosen only because the order worked well. "Burn the Witch" features "pulsating" strings and electronic percussion. "Daydreaming" is an ambient song with a "simple, sad" piano motif, "spooky" backmasked vocals, and electronic and orchestral elements. "Ful Stop" features "malevolent" synthesiser, a "bustle" of rhythms, and phasing guitar arpeggios. "Glass Eyes" has manipulated piano, strings, and lyrics evocative of an "unguarded phone call". "Identikit" has a jam-like opening, choral vocals, and "spacey" electronics, and ends with an "agitated" guitar solo.

"The Numbers" begins as a "loose-limbed, early 70s jam session", with strings reminiscent of Serge Gainsbourg's 1970 album Histoire De Melody Nelson. "Present Tense" is a ballad with bossa nova elements. "Tinker Tailor Soldier Sailor Rich Man Poor Man Beggar Man Thief" features strings, electronic percussion and distorted synthesiser. "True Love Waits" is a piano ballad with polyrhythmic loops and textures. The special edition of A Moon Shaped Pool contains two additional tracks: "Ill Wind", featuring a bossa nova rhythm and "icy" synthesisers, and "Spectre", an orchestral piano ballad.

Lyrics 
The lyrics discuss love, forgiveness, and regret with, according to Larson, "a sense that beyond tectonic heartbreak there is an anaemic acceptance that is kind of beautiful if you don't get too sad about it". Several critics felt the lyrics were coloured by Yorke's recent separation from his partner of almost 25 years, Rachel Owen, noting that the backmasked vocals of "Daydreaming", when reversed, resemble the words "half of my life". Spencer Kornhaber of the Atlantic wrote that A Moon Shaped Pool "makes the most sense when heard as a document of a wrenching chapter for one human being".

Other themes include climate change and call for revolution on "The Numbers", and the dangers of authority and groupthink on "Burn the Witch". Yorke feared that political songs alienated some listeners, but decided it was better than writing "another lovey-dovey song about nothing". He was conscious that lyrics such as "a river running dry" and "the system is a lie" were cliches, but felt there was no other way to state them: "How else are you supposed to say 'the system is a lie'? Why bother hiding it? It's a lie. That's it."

The Guardian wrote that where Hail to the Thief had addressed the era of Tony Blair and George W. Bush, A Moon Shaped Pool may become the "accidental soundtrack" to the Donald Trump presidency. Of the refrain "one day at a time" from "The Numbers", Yorke said: "One day a time, mate, you will be impeached shortly, mate. You are not a leader, love … You can't sustain this. It's not gonna work. One day a time. We ain't stupid."

Artwork
The artwork for A Moon Shaped Pool was created by Yorke with Radiohead's longtime collaborator Stanley Donwood. Donwood joined the band in France, and worked in a barn with speakers connected to the studio where they recorded nearby, allowing their music to influence his art. Wanting to move away from figurative art and create work that was more a product of chance, Donwood initially conceived a "painting Dalek" that would squirt paint at canvases, but this proved technically difficult. Instead, he experimented with weather, leaving canvases outdoors to allow the elements to affect the paint. Donwood continued the weathering process in Oxfordshire during the band's winter break, with "completely different results", before photographing the works and editing them in Photoshop with Yorke.

Release

A Moon Shaped Pool was released as a download on 8 May 2016 on Radiohead's website, online music stores including the iTunes Store and Amazon Music, and on paid streaming services. On Google Play Music, it was accidentally released several hours early. It was not added to Spotify until 17 June. Yorke and Godrich had publicly criticised Spotify in 2013, arguing that it cannot support new artists. Spotify had been in "advanced discussions" with XL and Radiohead's management to make A Moon Shaped Pool the first album available exclusively to Spotify users with premium subscriptions, but no agreement was reached. Spotify spokesperson Jonathan Prince said they and Radiohead had explored "new approaches", but could not overcome technical problems in time.

CD and LP editions were released in Japan on 15 June through Hostess Entertainment and in other countries on 17 June through XL Recordings. Radiohead sold a special edition from their website, which shipped from September. It contains the album on CD and two heavyweight 12" vinyl records, plus an additional CD with two extra tracks: "Ill Wind" and the previously released "Spectre". The special edition features packaging inspired by the albums for 78rpm shellac records in the La Fabrique studio, additional artwork and an original piece of master tape, less than a second in length, from one of Radiohead's prior recording sessions. As tape degrades over time, the band decided to include it in the special edition rather than have it "end up as landfill". On 20 June 2020, a white vinyl repress was released through independent online record stores for Love Record Stores Day.

Promotion

Radiohead conducted no interviews and did not tour before the release of A Moon Shaped Pool. O'Brien said the band members were not ready to talk about it when it was released: "We didn't want to talk about it being quite hard to make. We were quite fragile, and we needed to find our feet."

On 30 April 2016, days before the album was announced, fans who had previously made orders from Radiohead received embossed cards with lyrics from the lead single, "Burn the Witch". On 1 May, Radiohead deleted all content from their website and social media profiles, replacing them with blank images. Pitchfork interpreted the move as symbolic of Radiohead's re-emergence. Donwood said the idea had been "a way of getting rid of all of  had gone before ... It was like being some sort of evil Bond villain or something, in some lair, pressing buttons ... It was creatively brilliant fun."

After releasing excerpts on Instagram, Radiohead released "Burn the Witch" as a download on 3 May. It was accompanied by a stop-motion animated music video that homages the 1960s children's television series Trumpton and the 1973 horror film The Wicker Man. Three days later, Radiohead released "Daydreaming", accompanied by a music video directed by Paul Thomas Anderson, for whom Greenwood had scored several films. The video was projected in 35mm film in select theatres. On the same day, Radiohead announced that their next album would be released online the following Sunday, but did not reveal the title.

BBC Radio 6 Music played A Moon Shaped Pool in its entirety on the day of release. The following week, Radiohead released the first in a series of video vignettes set to clips from the album by artists and filmmakers including Michal Marczak, Tarik Barri, Grant Gee, Adam Buxton, Richard Ayoade, Yorgos Lanthimos and Ben Wheatley. This was followed by a fan competition to create a vignette for "Daydreaming". In September and October, Radiohead released video performances of "Present Tense" and "The Numbers". The videos, directed by Anderson, feature Yorke and Greenwood performing with a CR-78 drum machine.

On 17 June 2016, the day of the album's retail release, participating record shops held a promotional event, "Live From a Moon Shaped Pool". The event featured an audio stream curated by Radiohead, a recording of their performance at the London Roundhouse, and competitions, artwork and other activities. A participating shop in Istanbul closed following an attack by a gang angered by customers drinking beer and playing music during Ramadan. Radiohead released a statement condemning the attack and offering fans in Istanbul "love and support".

Tour 
Radiohead toured Europe, North America, and Japan from May to October 2016, joined by the second drummer, Clive Deamer. They began a second US tour in March 2017, culminating in April with a headline slot at the Coachella Festival in California. A European tour followed in June and July with further festival shows, including Radiohead's third headline performance at Glastonbury Festival in the UK. In 2018, Radiohead toured North and South America from April to August, including four nights at Madison Square Garden in New York City, with Jonny Greenwood's project Junun as the support act. The tour was the 61st-highest-grossing of 2018, earning over $28 million USD.

The Moon Shaped Pool tour included a performance in Tel Aviv on 19 July 2017, disregarding the Boycott, Divestment and Sanctions campaign for an international cultural boycott of Israel. The decision was criticised by artists including the musician Roger Waters and the filmmaker Ken Loach, and a petition urging Radiohead to cancel the concert was signed by more than 50 prominent figures. Yorke responded in a statement: "Playing in a country isn't the same as endorsing the government. Music, art and academia is about crossing borders not building them, about open minds not closed ones, about shared humanity, dialogue and freedom of expression."

Sales 
A Moon Shaped Pool was Radiohead's sixth number one on the UK Albums Chart. It also reached number one in Ireland, Norway and Switzerland, and the top ten in several other countries. It was certified gold in the UK on 24 June 2016 for sales of over 100,000 copies. Following the retail release in June, A Moon Shaped Pool returned to the top of the UK chart with sales of 44,000. Of these, 39,000 were retail copies, including 10,500 vinyl, making it the week's bestselling vinyl record. It was the UK's fourth-bestselling vinyl album of 2016, behind Blackstar by David Bowie, Back to Black by Amy Winehouse and the Guardians of the Galaxy soundtrack. "Burn the Witch" was the year's 26th-bestselling UK vinyl single.

In the US, A Moon Shaped Pool sold 181,000 copies in its first week, reaching number three on the Billboard 200, the week's highest debut. It was Radiohead's best American sales week since the debut of Hail to the Thief in 2003. With the release of the special edition a few months later, A Moon Shaped Pool climbed to number 11 on the Billboard 200 and number one on the vinyl album chart, selling 21,000 vinyl copies in one week. It was certified gold in the US on 9 November 2018, for sales of over 500,000 copies. The bonus track "Ill Wind", added to streaming services in 2019, reached number eight on the Billboard Alternative Digital Songs chart and number 24 on the Hot Rock Songs chart.

Critical reception

On the review aggregator website Metacritic, A Moon Shaped Pool has a score of 88 out of 100 based on 43 reviews, indicating "universal acclaim". Patrick Ryan of USA Today wrote that "the brooding, symphonic and poignant A Moon Shaped Pool ... was well worth the wait". Chris Gerard of PopMatters felt it was "worthy of Radiohead's peerless catalog, a rich addition to what is the most vital and important string of rock albums of the last 30 years". Jamieson Cox of the Verge praised the string arrangements and "emotional magnanimity". Andy Beta of Rolling Stone described it as "a haunting, stunning triumph" and Radiohead's "most gorgeous and desolate album", praising its timbres and melodies. Fellow Rolling Stone critic Will Hermes wrote that "it's Yorke's voice that holds the emotional centre, and it's never been more affecting ... [A Moon Shaped Pool is] one of their most musically and emotionally arresting albums."

Sam Richards of NME described A Moon Shaped Pool as "an album of eerie, elusive beauty that is strange, shimmering and uncertain all at the same time". Stephen Thomas Erlewine wrote for AllMusic that "there's a melancholic comfort to its ebb and flow, a gentle rocking motion that feels comforting; it's a tonic to the cloistered, scattered King of Limbs and even the sleek alienation of Kid A". Pitchfork editor Jayson Greene felt the album was coloured by Yorke's separation: "The impact of trauma, a sort of car crash of the soul, is palpable. The music here feels loose and unknotted, broken open in the way you can only be after a tragedy." Pitchfork later named "Daydreaming" and "True Love Waits" among the best songs of 2016.

Eric Renner Brown of Entertainment Weekly praised the variety and scale: "By nature, Radiohead albums will always be somewhat epic, but this one is more consistently grandiose than any of the band's releases since 2000's masterpiece Kid A." Jon Pareles, writing for The New York Times, wrote that A Moon Shaped Pool was perhaps "[Radiohead's] darkest statement – though the one with the band's most pastoral surface". He praised Yorke's vocals and Greenwood's string arrangements, writing: "Both Mr. Yorke and Mr. Greenwood are relentlessly inquisitive listeners, lovers of melody and explorers of idioms, makers of puzzles who don't shy away from emotion." Chris Barton of the Los Angeles Times described A Moon Shaped Pool as "a rich and engrossing listen that somehow finds more undiscovered territory for a band that has built a career on doing just that". MTV's Simon Vozick-Levinson wrote: "A Moon Shaped Pool provides a thrilling answer to the existential concerns that confront any band that's made it this far ... After all this time, hearing these five old friends challenge themselves into a new phase of evolution can still blow even a jaded fan's mind."

In The New York Observer, Justin Joffe wrote that A Moon Shaped Pool was "a stunning display of naked vulnerability and a notable achievement ... Radiohead remain dedicated craftsmen of strange new sonic universes." Like Joffe, Nina Corcoran of Consequence of Sound praised the inclusion of older songs such as "True Love Waits", writing that "Radiohead finally feels connected enough to perform them with meaning ... Waiting to release a studio recording of a song over two decades old allowed Radiohead to peel its words when riper than ever." Guardian writer Lanre Bakare praised the evolution of "Present Tense" from Yorke's earlier "sketchy guitar number" to "beautifully wrought, bossa nova-tinged ballad".

Mike Diver of the Quietus felt the older songs created the unwelcome feeling of a compilation album, writing: "Certain tracks feel less than fully fleshed out, really given the treatment that their age warrants ... There's simply so little spark here, barely glowing embers and blackened dust where once Radiohead blazed a fascinating, furious trail for others to attempt to follow." New Republic writer Ryan Kearney likened the album to "taking a warm, occasionally agitated bath; it's soothing and all, but the longer you immerse yourself, the colder it leaves you". He criticised Yorke's lyrics as predictable, and said it was "no coincidence that the only moving song on the album, 'True Love Waits', was written two decades ago".

Jamie Milton of DIY felt that A Moon Shaped Pool needed "another breakneck force shock to the system" similar to "Ful Stop", and that it contained unnecessary elements, such as the "over-tinkering echo" of "Present Tense" and the "jagged closing section" of "Decks Dark". Nonetheless, he concluded: "These are gorgeous, human, complete works – some of the best of [Radiohead's] remarkable career." Alexis Petridis of the Guardian criticised the "suffocating gloom" of the lyrics, but felt the album was an improvement over The King of Limbs and that Radiohead had achieved something new.

Accolades
A Moon Shaped Pool was the fifth Radiohead album nominated for the Mercury Prize, making Radiohead the most shortlisted act in the award's history. At the 59th Annual Grammy Awards, it was nominated for Best Alternative Music Album and Best Rock Song (for "Burn the Witch"). It was also shortlisted for the Independent Music Companies Association Album of the Year Award for the best album released on an independent European label. It appeared on numerous publications' lists of the best albums of the year and decade.

Track listing

All songs written by Radiohead.

 "Burn the Witch" – 3:40
 "Daydreaming" – 6:24
 "Decks Dark" – 4:41
 "Desert Island Disk" – 3:44
 "Ful Stop" – 6:07
 "Glass Eyes" – 2:52
 "Identikit" – 4:26
 "The Numbers" – 5:45
 "Present Tense" – 5:06
 "Tinker Tailor Soldier Sailor Rich Man Poor Man Beggar Man Thief" – 5:03
 "True Love Waits" – 4:43

Personnel
Adapted from the album liner notes.

Radiohead
 Colin Greenwood
 Jonny Greenwood
 Ed O'Brien
 Philip Selway
 Thom Yorke

Additional musicians
 Clive Deamer – additional drums on "Ful Stop"
 London Contemporary Orchestra – strings, female chorus
 Hugh Brunt – conducting

Production
 Nigel Godrich – production, mixing, engineering
 Sam Petts-Davies – engineering
 Maxime LeGuil – assistant engineering
 Bob Ludwig – mastering
 Tim Plank – studio crew
 Graeme Stewart – studio crew
 Michelle Shearer – studio crew

Artwork and design
 Stanley Donwood
 Thom Yorke, credited as Doctor Tchock

Charts

Weekly charts

Year-end charts

Certifications

Release history

References

External links

2016 albums
Albums produced by Nigel Godrich
Radiohead albums
XL Recordings albums
Electronic albums by English artists
Albums about climate change